Richard Lippincott (1615–1683) was an early settler of Shrewsbury, New Jersey. Lippincott was a devout English Quaker who emigrated to Colonial America to escape persecution for his religious beliefs.

Life  

Born in Devon, England, Richard Lippincott settled in Dorchester, Massachusetts Bay Colony and became a member of the church, consequently being made a Freeman by the General Court of Boston on 13 May 1640.

His first child, a son was born there and he was named Remembrance in the traditional Puritan manner. However Lippincott soon removed to Boston where his second son John and his eldest daughter Abigail were born. He was becoming disillusioned with New England Puritanism and was formally excommunicated on 6 July 1651 for being tenacious about his religious beliefs which became increasingly different from the church doctrine.  A year later he returned to England hoping to find greater religious liberties than he did in Massachusetts Bay.  He named his next child Restore in commemoration of this event.

After this he began to associate with George Fox and the Society of Friends (Quakers) and started debating with Fox's future wife Margaret Fell about whether Christ or the Scriptures was the Word of God. Lippincott was jailed at Plymouth, Devonshire for attesting that "Christ was the Word of God, and the Scriptures a document of the mind of God".  After his release he found the occasion to name his next child, a son, "Freedom".

Things were quiet for a while and during this time a daughter named Increase and a son named Jacob were born. After this last child he was again jailed for the "faithfulness of his religious convictions".  Fortunately he was released with the help of Margaret Fell who had some influence with Charles II.

Deciding that he was treated more poorly as a Quaker in England than he was in the New World he moved to Rhode Island where his last son Preserved was born as Lippincott finally believed that he had found liberty in Roger Williams' new colony. Later, he moved to the area of Shrewsbury, New Jersey after buying patents for purchase of which he was by far the largest shareholder. The reason given for the founding of the patents was in order that the inhabitants could experience "free liberty of Conscience without any molestation or disturbance whatever in the way of worship.

Famous descendants 

George W. Bush is a descendant of his son Freedom Lippincott through his mother,
Barbara Bush

Richard Nixon is a descendant of his son Restore Lippincott

Kevin Bacon is a descendant of his son Restore Lippincott

Sam Waterston, the American Actor, is a descendant of his son Freedom Lippincott through his mother, Alice.

Richard Lippincott (Loyalist), American Loyalist and British Army officer whom fled to Canada. Descended from son Remembrance.

References

Sources
 Lippincott, Five Generations of the Descendants of Richard and Abigail Lippincott, by Judith M. Olsen
 History of Burlington Co., New Jersey "Lippincott" pps. 222-223.
 Genealogical and Memorial History of the State of New Jersey pps. 531-542.
 Bulletin of the Gloucester Co., Historical Society Vol 5 No. 1 September. 1955.
 Shourds, Thomas (1876). "Lippincott Family" History and genealogy of Fenwick's Colony, New Jersey. Bridgeton, New Jersey: pp. 132–138  

1615 births
1683 deaths
People excommunicated by Christian churches
People from Shrewsbury, New Jersey
People of colonial New Jersey